The 2001 Algerian Cup Final was the 37th final of the Algerian Cup. The final took place on July 10, 2001, at Stade 5 Juillet 1962 in Algiers. USM Alger beat CR Mécheria 1-0 to win their 5th Algerian Cup.

Pre-match

Details

References

Cup
Algeria
Algerian Cup Finals
USM Alger matches